This is a list of current general managers in the National Hockey League. In the National Hockey League, the general manager of a team typically controls player transactions and bears the primary responsibility on behalf of the hockey club during contract discussions with players.

The general manager is also normally the person who hires, fires, and supervises the head and assistant coaches for both the NHL team and often the club's American Hockey League (AHL) affiliate, amateur and professional scouts, and all other hockey operations staff.

Current NHL general managers

See also
NHL General Manager of the Year Award
List of NHL head coaches

References

List